Christian Berg (born 17 May 1978) is a retired Norwegian football midfielder. He was the captain of Bodø/Glimt, where he started his professional career in 1996. He has made over 200 appearances for the club.

He is not related to the three brothers Ørjan, Runar and Arild Berg, who have also played for Bodø/Glimt.

Career statistics

Honours

Club
Fredrikstad
Norwegian Football Cup (1): 2006

References
Profile at Bodo/Glimt club website

1978 births
Living people
Norwegian footballers
FK Bodø/Glimt players
Fredrikstad FK players
Eliteserien players
Norwegian First Division players
Sportspeople from Bodø

Association football midfielders